Leave the Light On is the first studio album by American country music singer Lorrie Morgan, with such singles as "Trainwreck of Emotion" at #20, "Dear Me" at #9, "Out of Your Shoes" at #2, "Five Minutes" at #1, and "He Talks to Me" at #4. On the original vinyl LP, there were only nine tracks, but the CD version adds two more, including a cover of the Beatles' 1965 single, "Eight Days a Week."

Track listing

Personnel
Adapted from liner notes.

Eddie Bayers - drums
Barry Beckett - keyboards
Steve Gibson - electric guitar
Lloyd Green - steel guitar
Randy Hayes - background vocals
Mitch Humphries - keyboards
Doug Jernigan - steel guitar
Mike Lawler - keyboards
Carl Marsh - special fairlight series III programming
Lorrie Morgan - lead vocals
Mark O'Connor - fiddle
Dave Pomeroy - bass guitar
Don Potter - acoustic guitar
Bruce Rutherford - background vocals
Reggie Young - electric guitar

Charts

Weekly charts

Year-end charts

Certifications

References

1989 debut albums
Lorrie Morgan albums
RCA Records albums
Albums produced by Barry Beckett